Four ships of the French Navy have borne the name Friedland, in honour of the Battle of Friedland

 , a 16-gun brig, captured in 1808 and taken into the Royal Navy as HMS Delight; she was sold in 1814.
 , a   80-gun ship of the line.
 , a 120-gun ship of the line fitted with a steam engine.
  (1877), an ironclad ("frégate cuirassée", lit. "armoured frigate") .

French Navy ship names